Hargrave Military Academy (HMA) is a private, all-male,  military boarding school located in the town of Chatham, Virginia. Hargrave is affiliated with the Baptist General Association of Virginia emphasizing Christian values that focuses on a college and military preparatory program. The school serves boys from around the world for grade 7 through post-graduate (PG). Hargrave was named a National School of Character in 2016. Hargrave is accredited by the Virginia Association of Independent Schools and nationally by AdvancEd, and is a member of the Association of Military Colleges and Schools of the United States and the National Association of Independent Schools.  The school's campus is listed on the National Register of Historic Places.

History
Hargrave Military Academy was founded in 1909 by T. Ryland Sanford and J. Hunt Hargrave as the Chatham Training School (CTS). In 1925, in honor of Hargrave, CTS was renamed to Hargrave Military Academy (HMA). The renaming of the school was part of the school's evolution into a military high school in the early twenties. HMA has been approved for JROTC numerous times since then, but many in the Hargrave community, most notably the Board of Trustees, feared that the addition of that program would put too much emphasis on military studies and reduce the emphasis on academics. HMA has consistently operated independent of JROTC, however, including by utilizing its own uniforms, cadet rank structure, and chain of command.

On February 20, 1950, a fire destroyed Hargrave Hall and Founders Hall. No cadets or faculty were harmed, but Sanford Hall was the only building that remained unscathed. After an assembly before Colonel Camden in the Sanford Hall auditorium, a two-week vacation was declared. This was to allow time for Hargrave staff to work out a way to continue the regular academic schedule.

The first African-American cadets were admitted to Hargrave in summer 1971 after the board of trustees passed a resolution that Hargrave would not consider race, color, or country of origin in its admission or employment policy and Colonel Vernon T. Lankford signed the Civil Rights Agreement. Andrew Ballen became the first black battalion commander in 1991.

With enrollment at 586 for the 1970-1971 academic year, the Hargrave Corps of Cadets was organized into two battalions led by a Corps Commander with the rank of cadet colonel. Since 1971, the HMA Corps of Cadets has remained as a single battalion; its commander is a Cadet Lieutenant Colonel. Female cadets were admitted for the first time in the 1975-1976 year, and Geri Lou Huizinga and Lynn Emerson became the first women to graduate from HMA in 1976. Hargrave made the transition back to an all-male school in the early 2000s; the last female cadets graduated in 2009.

In 1981, the school presented for the first time the General Douglas MacArthur Award; the first cadet to receive it was Henry A. Haymes. That same year, school officials turned down the request to film on campus by the producers of the movie Taps, due to disagreements with film's plot and opposition to the producers’ request to erect a wall around the front of the campus.

A four-week summer program began in 2009. In September, Hargrave celebrated the school's 100th founders day under the leadership of Colonel Wheeler L. Baker.

Organization
Hargrave Military Academy is governed by a board of trustees. Many members of the board are alumni and community leaders. HMA created a charitable foundation to allow philanthropists an opportunity to make gifts to the school.

Presidents of HMA:
 Headmaster Charles R. Warren (1909–1911)
 Rev. T. Ryland Sanford (1911–1918)
 Col. Aubrey H. Camden (1918–1951)
 Col. Joseph Hathaway Cosby (1951–1970)
 Col. Vernon Thomas Lankford Sr. (1970–1987)
 Col. Michael Bruce Colegrove (1987–1989)
 Col. Andrew W. Todd (1989–1990)
 Col. Thomas N. Cunningham (1990–1997)
 Col. John W. Ripley, USMC (ret.) (1997–1999)
 Dr. Wheeler L. Baker, Col. USMC (ret.) (1999–2011)
 Brig. Gen. Doyle Broome, USA (ret.) (2011–2017)
 Dr. Wheeler L. Baker, Col. USMC (ret.) (2017–2018)
 Col. Michael Allen Brown, USMC (ret.) (2018–2021)
 The Honorable Sloan D. Gibson, former Deputy Secretary, U.S. Department of Veterans Affairs (2021–Present)

Teachings and curriculum
One of Hargrave Military Academy's four pillars is academic excellence. Both Standard and Advanced High School Diplomas are offered to graduating cadets, as well as dual-enrollment classes through Danville Community College, Liberty University, and Richard Bland College. In addition to the 7–12 grade middle and high school, a one-year postgraduate program is also offered. Eligible students can enroll in a variety of honors and AP classes. Cadets have the opportunity to make academic honor rolls every grading period, consisting of the Dean's List and President's List. Post-Graduate students are eligible for the President's Commendation list.

Hargrave utilizes an "Enhanced Learning Through Technology" program, providing internet access in every room on campus. Cadets have the ability to work on class material, study, and contact their instructors at any time, from any place on campus.

In 2003, and 2011 Hargrave completed two upgrades to the academic space, including four laboratory areas, a new art studio, a college lecture-style learning center called the DLC (distance learning center), a "leadership center" and a greatly expanded video production classroom where cadets produce weekly announcement videos. Also, Hargrave's campus contains a refurbished auditorium.

Cadet technology resources require a personal computer for every student, while Hargrave provides access to Google Drive. An SAT prep program, and a variety of computer-based teaching applications in mathematics, English and psychology are all parts of Hargrave's academic approach.

Hargrave's library contains more than 14,000 reference and book volumes and a computer network. Through the network, Cadets can access 44 reference and research databases online, 19 reference eBooks in the virtual library, access the Atomic Learning Tutor for software programs, and access subject specific learning programs, such as Boxer Math. Hargrave also utilizes Blackboard, a class teaching program.

Colin Powell Center for Leadership & Ethics
Hargrave Military Academy offers a General Colin Powell Center for Leadership & Ethics; that was established to provide Cadets with a challenging, progressive and structured leadership education. Hargrave Cadets are taught to lead in an academic environment and through practical application by applying learned leadership techniques in day-to-day situations.

Cadets are given the opportunity to enroll in a formal Leadership and Ethics Class (a ½ credit class of 18 weeks in length). The curriculum includes an investigation of the foundations of leadership such as Leadership Traits, Leadership Principles, Leadership Styles and Ethical Behavior. During their sophomore year, Cadets begin to assume positions as small unit leaders (squad leaders) which permits practical application of the leadership principles learned in the classroom. Upon completion of this Leadership 1 course, cadets can enroll in Leadership 2, which goes into more detail on the leadership traits, principles, and techniques encouraged by General Colin Powell.

Cadets who complete the requirements of the Colin Powell Leadership Program may apply for the Colin Powell Leadership Medal; an honor only select Cadets achieve. If they are accepted, Cadets will earn the Colin Powell Leadership Medal, and, upon graduation, a Certificate in Leadership Studies along with their Hargrave Military Academy Diploma.

Military structure
According to its website, "Hargrave's military program is designed to present an environment in which a Cadet may gain a sense of humor, commitment, and fidelity. The daily exposure of a military environment assists Cadets in developing self-discipline, character, ethics, team building, and leadership." Military aspects include the wearing of uniforms, a military-style organization of personnel, ranks, and a chain of command. Hargrave issues its own dress uniforms and PTG, but provides cadets with US Army style army combat uniforms.

Corps of Cadets
The Corps of Cadets consists of a battalion divided into four companies: Alpha, Bravo, Delta, and Band. Every six weeks grading period, an "Honor Company" is chosen. The honor company is the company with the best overall academic and military performance. For winning, they eat first at mess, and display a streamer on their guidon.

The rank structure at Hargrave is similar to that of the United States Army, and includes the rank of Basic Cadet.

After attending Non-Commissioned Officers (SNCO) School prior to the beginning of the academic year, cadets can obtain NCO ranks and positions. One cadet is appointed to the rank of Command Sergeant Major, serving on Battalion staff as the highest-ranking NCO. 

The week before the start of their senior year, cadets have the option of attending Officer Candidate School (OCS), which allows them to obtain commissioned officer ranks. The OCS Completion Ribbon is awarded to those cadets who finish OCS. A cadet officer can hold many leadership positions ranging from auxiliary to Battalion Commander. The corps is run by the cadet officers and is supervised by the military faculty members. The Battalion Commander is the commanding officer of the corps. The Battalion XO is the second highest position in the Corps of Cadets whose primary job is to manage the Battalion Staff. The Battalion Staff is responsible for all operations throughout the Corps. Blouse rank insignia on HMA dress uniforms is similar to those used at West Point, with large yellow and black edged stripes.

Discipline

Notable at Hargrave is the notorious Bullring, a square painted on cement in the middle of campus. Cadets who violate any of the rules and regulations may be sent to the Bullring to walk tours. One hour of walking around the Bullring in uniform makes up a single tour. Cadets may also be briefly subject to PT in the bullring for minor infractions.

Honor system

The honor code prohibits cadets from lying, cheating, or stealing. Any cadet that violates, or is accused of violating, any part of the honor code may be sent to the Honor Council which consists of a panel of cadets that are appointed by school officials, where, if found guilty, may be subject to sanctions based on the severity of the incident.

Athletics

Varsity
Hargrave fields many varsity athletic teams, including football, basketball, baseball, wrestling, soccer, golf, lacrosse, cross country, track and field, rifle, and swimming.

Post-graduate basketball

The Tigers have won three National Prep Championships since a formal tournament began in the mid 2000’s. The program has produced hundreds of players that went on to play NCAA Division 1 basketball, and 26 that have gone on to play in the National Basketball Association. The program has also been a breeding ground for college coaches, as many former head coaches and assistants have ascended through the ranks at the NCAA Division 1 level. The Hargrave Military Academy basketball program was named “Program of the Decade” by RealGM in 2012 after a study showing that Hargrave produced more successful college basketball players than any other prep school or high school in the nation. The program was also featured on a season 2 episode of CNN's Inside Man.

Clubs and organizations
There are many  clubs and organizations that cadets can participate in while attending Hargrave, including: 

 National Beta Club
 Boy Scouts
 Key Club
 Spanish Club
 Speech and Debate
 Robotics
 Drama
 Choir
 Band
 Camden Rifles drill team
 The Highlanders (Bagpipes)
 Scuba
 Fellowship of Christian Athletes

Notable alumni

Politics, military, and business
Lieutenant General  William B. Caldwell IV (1972) – former commander of United States Army North (5th Army), current President of Georgia Military College.
Walter Davis (1938) – former CEO of Occidental Petroleum
Walter B. Jones (1961) – U.S. Representative for 
Herbert Lee King (1990) - current President of Lees-McRae College
Sloan D. Gibson (1971) — U.S. Secretary of Veterans Affairs, President of Hargrave Military Academy (2021-present)

Literature, television and arts
Andrew Ballen (1991) – A&R executive, entrepreneur and TV personality in mainland China
Tom Robbins – Novelist, short story writer, essayist

Baseball
Jon Nunnally (1990) – Major League Baseball player
Taylor Sanford (1925) – head coach of 1955 College World Series champion Wake Forest

Basketball
Larry Brown '59, former head coach of the Charlotte Bobcats, New York Knicks, Detroit Pistons, Philadelphia 76ers, Indiana Pacers, Los Angeles Clippers, San Antonio Spurs, New Jersey Nets, Denver Nuggets
Kęstutis Marčiulionis '96, former player for Delaware who most recently played professionally with Volukte Kaunas. Won a bronze medal at the 2000 Summer Olympics with Lithuania.
Korleone Young ‘98, Detroit Pistons
Lonny Baxter ‘98, Chicago Bulls
Anthony Grundy ‘98, Atlanta Hawks
Ronald Blackshear '99, former player for Temple and Marshall. Last played professionally for CSU Atlassib Sibiu.
Josh Howard ‘99, Dallas Mavericks
David West ‘99, Golden State Warriors
James Thomas ‘00, Philadelphia 76ers
Tony Bobbitt ‘00, Los Angeles Lakers
Brian Chase ‘00, Los Angeles Lakers
A. W. Hamilton '00, Head coach of the Eastern Kentucky Colonels
Ricky Shields '01 , former player for Rutgers. Last played for Mitteldeutscher BC.
Sharrod Ford ‘01, Phoenix Suns
James White ‘01, New York Knicks
Tim Smith '02, former player for East Tennessee State. Last played professionally for BSC Raiffeisen Panthers Fürstenfeld.
Stanley Burrell '04, former player for Xavier and last played Czarni Słupsk.
Lorrenzo Wade '04, former player for Louisville and San Diego State. Last played professionally for the Delaware 87ers of the NBA G League.
Joe Alexander ‘05, Milwaukee Bucks
Sam Young ‘05, Indiana Pacers
Ángel Daniel Vassallo '05, former player for Virginia Tech and currently playing professionally with Leones de Ponce. Member of the Puerto Rico national basketball team.
Armon Bassett '06, former player for Indiana and Ohio. Last played professionally for Ironi Ramat Gan  
Vernon Macklin ’06 , Detroit Pistons
Tyler Smith '06, former player for Iowa and Tennessee. Last played for Elitzur Eito Ashkelon of the Israeli National League.
Marreese Speights ‘06, Orlando Magic
Jeff Allen '07, former player for Virginia Tech. First player in ACC history to record 1,500 career points, 1,000 rebounds, 200 steals and 150 blocked shots.
Jordan Crawford ‘07, Boston Celtics
Mike Scott ‘07, Atlanta Hawks
Dee Bost ‘08, Portland Trail Blazers
Tommy Brenton '08, former player for Stony Brook. Last played professionally for Link Tochigi Brex. 2013 Lefty Driesell Award winner.
Anthony Grundy '08, former player for NC State. Last played professionally for Hacettepe University.
Eshaunte Jones '08, former player for Nebraska and Northern Kentucky.
Damier Pitts '08, former player for Marshall and current professional player for Godel Rabotnički.
Maurice Creek '09, former player for Indiana and George Washington and current professional player for Prometey Kamianske of the Ukrainian Basketball SuperLeague
Luke Hancock ‘09, Memphis Grizzlies
Lorenzo Brown ‘10, basketball player in the Israeli Basketball Premier League, formerly in the NBA
J.J. Mann '10, former player for Belmont and current professional player for Okapi Aalstar
PJ Hairston ‘11, Charlotte Hornets
Dez Wells ‘11, Washington Wizards
Montrezl Harrell ‘12, Los Angeles Clippers
Codi Miller-McIntyre '12, former player for Wake Forest and current professional player for KK Cedevita Olimpija. 
Ryan Taylor '12, former player for Marshall and former professional player for Íþróttafélag Reykjavíkur. 
Shannon Evans '13, former player for Arizona State and Buffalo and current professional player for Atomerőmű SE
Anton Gill '13, former player for Louisville and Nebraska. Current professional player in Iraq.
Terry Rozier ‘13, Charlotte Hornets
Donte Grantham ‘14, Los Angeles Clippers
Jon Davis ‘15, Orlando Magic
Hassani Gravett ’15, Orlando Magic
Naji Marshall '17, New Orleans Pelicans

Football
Branden Albert – National Football League player for the Miami Dolphins
Curtis Brinkley – NFL player
Ahmad Brooks – NFL player for the San Francisco 49ers
Zach Brown – NFL player for the Buffalo Bills
Martavis Bryant – NFL wide receiver for the Pittsburgh Steelers
Quinton Coples – NFL player for the New York Jets
Ego Ferguson Jr. – NFL player
Jared Gaither – NFL player who last played for the San Diego Chargers
Laurence Gibson (2008) – NFL player
Charles Grant (2002) – NFL defensive end
Vidal Hazelton (2006) – CFL player for Edmonton Eskimos
Anthony Hill – NFL player
Torry Holt (1995) – NFL player, 7-time Pro Bowler and a member of the Super Bowl XXXIV champion St. Louis Rams
John Jerry – NFL player for the New York Giants
Brandon Lang – football player who last played for the Ottawa Redblacks
Solomon Page (1995) – NFL player
Jerrell Powe – NFL player for the Houston Texans
Justin Senior – Kansas City Chiefs offensive tackle
Jyles Tucker (1903) – NFL player
DJ Ware – NFL player who last played for the Tampa Bay Buccaneers
Muhammad Wilkerson – NFL player for the Green Bay Packers
Keiland Williams – Former NFL Player

NASCAR
Ward Burton (1982) – NASCAR driver, 2002 Daytona 500 winner

Notable attendees
Joe Alexander (born 1986) - American-Israeli basketball player in the Israel Basketball Premier League
Tarell Basham – NFL defensive end for Dallas Cowboys
Leonard Floyd – NFL linebacker for Chicago Bears
Montrezl Harrell – NBA player for Los Angeles Lakers
Shaq Lawson – NFL defensive end for Buffalo Bills
Evan Marriott
Jarran Reed – NFL defensive tackle for Seattle Seahawks
Isaiah Swann (born 1985), professional basketball player
Cordrea Tankersley – NFL cornerback for Miami Dolphins
Mike Tyson – NFL cornerback for Seattle Seahawks
Stephen Wallace (2000–2001) – NASCAR driver

Further reading

Fifty Years of Christian Education In a Baptist School: A Historical Record of Hargrave Military Academy 1909–1959, 1959, by COL Aubrey H. Camden
 From Ashes to Excellence 1950–1970, 1984, by COL Joseph H. Cosby
 Years of Change; Years of Growth: A History of Hargrave Military Academy 1970–2003, 2004, by Mary M. Tallent

References

External links

Hargrave Military Academy

Military high schools in the United States
Schools in Pittsylvania County, Virginia
Private high schools in Virginia
Private middle schools in Virginia
Educational institutions established in 1909
Universities and colleges affiliated with the Southern Baptist Convention
Baptist Christianity in Virginia
1909 establishments in Virginia
Boarding schools in Virginia
Boys' schools in the United States
National Register of Historic Places in Pittsylvania County, Virginia